Pianopoli is a small town in the Catanzaro province of Calabria in southern Italy. The population is 2,373 (2000 figure).

References

 City of Pianopoli, Calabria information
 Calabrian town information